Sonic Boom Bap is the ninth solo EP of American record producer and rapper, J57. It was released on September 27, 2017 through his imprint FiveSe7en Music and features several artistes including Tenacity, Exile, Blame One, Toki Wright, amongst others; with music production from LuvJonez, Big Cats and DJ Big Jeff.

Background and composition
The EP is the follow up of Landmines which was released in 2016. In an interview with HipHopDX, J57 revealed that the self-produced 8-track project comprises songs which could not make the cut for his upcoming album and thought they "were too good to go to waste", hence the release of the EP. The EP sees J57 rap about personal issues as evidenced in "My Resolution", "Sometimes" and "Same Old Jimmy", backed with hardcore hip hop sounds and a bit of jazz as seen in "Listening to Axelrod".

Track listing
Album credits adapted from official liner notes.

References

J57 EPs
Albums produced by J57
2017 EPs